Weißkopf, Weisskopf, Weiskopf are surnames of the following notable people:

 Alison Weisskopf (1960–2018), British archaeologist
 Bob Weiskopf (1914–2001), American screenwriter and producer
 Franz Carl Weiskopf (1900–1955), Prague-born German-speaking writer
 Gustav Weißkopf, birthname of Gustave Whitehead (1874–1927), aviation pioneer
 Kim Weiskopf (1947–2009), American television writer
 Martin C. Weisskopf (born 1942), American astrophysicist
 Michael Weisskopf (born 1946), journalist
 Tom Weiskopf (1942-2022), American professional golfer
 Toni Weisskopf (born 1965), American science fiction editor and the publisher of Baen Books
 Victor Frederick Weisskopf (1908–2002), Austrian-born American theoretical physicist

See also
17050 Weiskopf (1999 FX45), main-belt asteroid discovered in 1999

German-language surnames
Jewish surnames